Gỏi nhệch is a Vietnamese salad made with the small fry of the local paddy field eel (Vietnamese cá nhệch, Latin pisodonophis boro). It is associated with the Hải Phòng area.

See also
 List of salads

References

Vietnamese cuisine